Juan Ignacio Gómez Taleb (born 20 May 1985), commonly known as Juanito, is an Argentine footballer who plays as a striker for Italian  club Virtus Verona.

Club career

Triestina
He made his Serie B debut with Triestina during the 2005–06 season.

Bellaria
Juanito left for Bellaria in co-ownership deal in summer 2007 after a successful loan,

Verona
In June 2008 Triestina bought back Juanito for €21,500 from Bellaria. In the same transfer window he was sold to Verona in another co-ownership deal for €80,000. In June 2009 Triestina gave up the residual 50% registration rights to Verona for free. In 2010–2011 his 18 goals ensured that he was a key player in the promotion of Gubbio to Serie B, the club's first appearance in the division in 63 years.

On 7 July 2015 Juanito signed a new contract with Verona.

On 8 August 2017, he came to a mutual agreement with the club to cancel his contract.

Serie C
On 11 September 2018, he signed with the Serie C club Sicula Leonzio on a one-year deal with option for the second year.

On 22 October 2019, he returned to Gubbio (now back in the Serie C) until the end of the 2019–20 season. A few days earlier Vincenzo Torrente, who coached Juanito with Gubbio to promotion to Serie B in the 2010–11 season, was hired as the club's head coach once again.

On 10 July 2021, he joined Legnago.

Personal life
In October 2020 he tested positive for COVID-19.

Career statistics

References

External links 
 Hellas Verona F.C. Official Player Profile

1985 births
Living people
People from Reconquista, Santa Fe
Sportspeople from Santa Fe Province
Argentine footballers
Association football forwards
Serie A players
Serie B players
Serie C players
U.S. Triestina Calcio 1918 players
A.C. Bellaria Igea Marina players
Hellas Verona F.C. players
A.S. Gubbio 1910 players
U.S. Cremonese players
A.S.D. Sicula Leonzio players
F.C. Legnago Salus players
Virtus Verona players
Argentine expatriate footballers
Expatriate footballers in Italy
Argentine expatriate sportspeople in Italy